Corcoran Field is a 1,600-seat soccer stadium located on the campus of Xavier University in Cincinnati, Ohio. It is part of the Xavier University Soccer Complex.

It is home to the Xavier University men's and women's soccer teams, who compete in the Big East Conference.  The Xavier football team played at XU Soccer Complex until 1972.

Renovations 
The facility underwent renovations in 2011, which included the installation of FieldTurf.

External links
Map:

References 
Sports venues in Cincinnati
Soccer venues in Ohio
Xavier Musketeers soccer
College soccer venues in the United States